Nuaillé-sur-Boutonne (literally Nuaillé on Boutonne) is a commune in the Charente-Maritime department in southwestern France.

Geography
The village lies on the left bank of the river Boutonne, which forms most of the commune's western border.

Population

See also
 Communes of the Charente-Maritime department

References

External links
 

Communes of Charente-Maritime